Heidel is a surname. Notable people with the surname include:

Alexander Heidel (1907–1955), American assyriologist
Christian Heidel (born 1963), German football executive
Edith Ogden Heidel (1870–1956), American sculptor
Jimmy Heidel (born 1943), American football player
Sebastian Heidel (born 1989), German football player
Willi Heidel (1916–2008), Romanian handball player

See also

German-language surnames